Tapio is a Finnish surname. Notable people with the surname include:

 Neal Tapio (born 1970), American businessman
 Nina Tapio (born 1972), Finnish singer, songwriter, musical actor, and session musician
 Juha Tapio (born 1974), Finnish singer, lyricist, composer and guitarist
 Jussi Tapio (born 1986), Finnish ice hockey player
 Kari Tapio (1945–2010), Finnish singer

Finnish-language surnames